"Sally Walker" is a song by Australian rapper Iggy Azalea from her second studio album, In My Defense (2019). It was released as the lead single from the album on 15 March 2019, independently by her own label Bad Dreams Records via Empire Distribution. The song was written by Azalea alongside producer J. White Did It. The music video, directed by Colin Tilley, accompanied its release the same day. The song debuted and peaked at number 62 on the Billboard Hot 100.

Background
On 11 December 2018, Azalea shared a preview of the single through Instagram. In February 2019, the announcement of the single release was accompanied by a picture of Azalea in a "dramatic cobalt-blue eye makeup and a bold red lip" with a "Barbie-esque look" in front of a blood-orange background. The song title is in a cross shape above her head, and below Azalea are the words "A Celebration of Life" and the release date. The official single cover was then unveiled a few days later and featured the rapper posing on the hood of a monster-truck hearse wearing a giant red veil. The title is a reference to children's rhyme dance game Little Sally Walker. Internet personality and makeup artist James Charles, who did Azalea's makeup for the artwork, filmed a makeup tutorial with Azalea ahead of the release date.

Composition
"Sally Walker" was written by Azalea alongside its producer J. White Did It, who also serves as the executive producer on In My Defense. The track is two minutes and fifty-eight seconds long. It is a trap-inspired hip hop song, that includes a piano melody. Its piano beat was noted to be similar to Cardi B's "Money" (2018), which was also produced by White, and Kendrick Lamar's "Humble" (2017), produced by Mike Will Made It. The song interpolates the popular nursery rhyme of the same name and follows the same flow. The "sassy, attitude-heavy" lyrics are described as showcasing "an Iggy that is unbothered by criticism as she's her own number one fan."

Critical reception
"Sally Walker" received positive reviews from music critics. Mike Nied of Idolator said the song "puts a fresh spin on the much-loved kiddie anthem," describing it as "both twerkable and hummable". Writing for V magazine, Julian Wright stated that Azalea "shows off her lyrical prowess and playful delivery" and the song "weaves through coy choruses of the game's repetitive nursery rhyme and clever bars delivered with heft". HipHopDX commented that "Iggy has been making a huge effort with her career as of lately, and it has been paying off, as many of the work she puts out really slaps," while Rap-Up said "the twerk-ready banger marks a return to Iggy's mixtape roots." Dani Blum of Pitchfork, in an otherwise negative review of its parent album In My Defense, praised "Sally Walker" as the best song on the album, comparing its "sparkling piano chords" to Cardi B's "Money".

Music video

Background and release

Azalea has been teasing the music video for "Sally Walker" since posting a call for the clip on Twitter. She shared various pictures from the music video, which feature her sitting on top of cars in elaborate garments. The clip accompanied the song's release on 15 March 2019. It was shot in Atlanta and directed by Colin Tilley, who previously directed Azalea's videos for "Savior" (2018) and "Kream" (2018). It features cameo appearances by makeup artist James Charles and drag queens Shea Couleé, Vanessa Vanjie Mateo, and Mayhem Miller. The girl who dies in the video is believed to be allusive to American rapper Bhad Bhabie who Azalea once had an incident with. As of July 2020, the video has over 75 million views on YouTube, becoming Azalea's 18th video to achieve this milestone.

Synopsis
The music video has a funeral-themed storyline. It opens up with Couleé accidentally hitting the title character, Sally Walker, by her car. "Didn't her momma teach her not to play in the street?" she wonders. Mateo, Miller, and Charles appear later as the video moves to Sally's church-set funeral, where a lavender-haired Azalea is rapping from the pews. The video concludes with a preview of another song called "Started", which was released as the follow-up single.

Live performances
The first televised performance of the song took place on Jimmy Kimmel Live! on 4 April 2019 during the show's week-long stint in Las Vegas, with Azalea performing at Zappos Theater at Planet Hollywood in front of the famed Stardust logo. After a solo intro from Vanessa Vanjie Mateo, who is also featured in the song's music video, Azalea emerged from inside a red coffin in a red bodysuit covered with pearls, along with female dancers, as neon logos for some iconic Strip landmarks flashed on stage throughout the performance.

Awards and nominations

Charts

Certifications

Release history

References

2019 singles
2019 songs
Iggy Azalea songs
Music videos directed by Colin Tilley
Song recordings produced by J. White Did It
Songs written by Iggy Azalea
Songs written by J. White Did It
Empire Distribution singles
Songs about revenge